The 1989 PBA season was the 15th season of the Philippine Basketball Association (PBA).

Board of governors

Executive committee
 Rodrigo L. Salud (Commissioner) 
 Reynaldo Marquez (Chairman, representing Formula Shell Zoom Masters)
 Jose C. Ibazeta (Vice-Chairman, representing San Miguel Beermen)
 Wilfred Steven Uytengsu (Treasurer, representing Alaska Milkmen)

Teams

Season highlights
The league picked up the concessionaire franchise fee in The ULTRA worth P1.5 million and agreed with member teams that sells food products (Alaska, Purefoods, San Miguel and Presto) to sell their products inside the venue at factory price. Likewise, Shell and Anejo will shoulder the cost of building pedestrian walkways outside of the arena.
The richest crop of rookies and the most talented PBA batch of draftees came to the PBA in its 15th season, most notable names were Benjie Paras, Nelson Asaytono, Dindo Pumaren, Paul Alvarez, Zaldy Realubit, Elmer Cabahug, Romeo Dela Rosa, Renato Agustin and Ricric Marata. 
The PBA logo was prominently displayed on the uniforms for the first time (usually on the left side of the jersey), becoming the first sports league in the Philippines to do so. The practice of placing the league logo on the jerseys eventually spreads to the PABL, UAAP and NCAA.
The PBA All-Star game was held on June 4, featuring the Veterans, coach by Baby Dalupan, against the Rookies/Sophomores of coach Dante Silverio. The Veterans won the game on Ramon Fernandez's last-second basket on an inbound pass from former Toyota teammate Sonny Jaworski. The All-Star MVP was awarded to Elmer Cabahug of the Rookies/Sophomores team. 
The San Miguel Beermen completed a three-conference sweep, becoming the second team to win the third Grand Slam in the League. Beermen coach Norman Black was the third coach to win the said feat, following the footsteps of Baby Dalupan in 1976 and Tommy Manotoc in 1983, who both achieved the Grand Slam with the Crispa Redmanizers.
Shell rookie center Benjie Paras, the first overall draft pick of the season, made history by winning both the Most Valuable Player and the Rookie of the Year awards, the only occurrence in the league.

Opening ceremonies
The muses for the participating teams are as follows:

Champions
 Open Conference: San Miguel Beermen
 All-Filipino Conference: San Miguel Beermen
 Reinforced Conference: San Miguel Beermen
 Team with best win–loss percentage: San Miguel Beermen (50-21, .704)
 Best Team of the Year: San Miguel Beermen (2nd)

Open Conference

Elimination round

Semifinal round

Third place playoffs 

|}

Finals

|}
Best Import of the Conference: Bobby Parks (Shell)

All-Filipino Conference

Elimination round

Semifinal round

Third place playoffs 

|}

Finals

|}

Reinforced Conference

Elimination round

Semifinal round

Third place playoffs 

|}

Finals

|}
Best Import of the Conference: Carlos Briggs (Shell)

Awards
 Most Valuable Player: Benjie Paras (Shell)
 Rookie of the Year:  Benjie Paras (Shell)
 Most Improved Player: Dante Gonzalgo (Añejo)
 Best Import-Open Conference: Bobby Parks (Shell)
 Best Import-Reinforced Conference: Carlos Briggs (Añejo)
 Mythical Five:
Hector Calma (San Miguel)
Ramon Fernandez (San Miguel)
Benjie Paras (Shell)
Alvin Patrimonio (Purefoods)
Allan Caidic (Presto)
 Mythical Second Team:
Elmer Reyes (San Miguel)
Ronnie Magsanoc (Shell)
Jerry Codiñera (Purefoods)
Paul Alvarez (Alaska)
Alvin Teng (San Miguel)
 All-Defensive Team:
Jerry Codiñera (Purefoods)
Glenn Capacio (Purefoods)
Alvin Teng (San Miguel)
Elpidio Villamin (Alaska)
Chito Loyzaga (Añejo)

Board of Governors
 Rudy Salud (Commissioner)
 Rey Marquez (Chairman, Pilipinas Shell Petroleum Corp.)
 Jose Ibazeta (Vice-Chairman, San Miguel Corp.)
 Ruben Cleofe (Secretary)
 Wilfred Steven Uytengsu (Treasurer, General Milling Corp.)
 Lance Gokongwei (Consolidated Food Corp.)
 Carlos Palanca III (La Tondeña Distillers, Inc.)
 Renato Buhain (Purefoods Corp.)

Cumulative standings

References

 
PBA